The pyramid of Djedefre consists today mostly of ruins located at Abu Rawash in Egypt. It is Egypt's northernmost pyramid and is believed to have been built by Djedefre, son and successor to king Khufu.

Theories 
Though some Egyptologists in the last few decades have suggested otherwise, recent excavations at Abu Rawash carried out by Dr. Michel Baud of the Louvre Museum in Paris suggest the pyramid was in fact more than half finished. If completed, however, it is suggested to have been about the same size as the pyramid of Menkaure – the third largest of the Giza pyramids.  It is believed to have originally been the most beautiful of the pyramids, with an exterior of polished, imported granite, limestone and crowned with a large pyramidion. It is also believed for this reason the completed pyramid was largely deconstructed by the Roman Empire to build their own construction projects after the conquest of Egypt under Roman Emperor Augustus. The pyramid's ancient name was "Djedefre's Starry Sky". The destruction started at the end of the New Kingdom at the latest, and was particularly intense during the Roman and early Christian eras when a Coptic monastery was built in nearby Wadi Karin. It has been proven, moreover, that at the end of the nineteenth century, stone was still being hauled away at the rate of three hundred camel loads a day.

Description  
Djedefre's pyramid was architecturally different from those of his immediate predecessors in that the chambers were beneath the pyramid instead of inside.  The pyramid was built over a natural mound and the chambers were created using the "pit and ramp" method, previously used on some mastaba tombs.  Djedefre dug a pit 21m x 9m and 20m deep in the natural mound. A ramp was created at an angle of 22º35' and the chambers and access passage were built within the pit and on the ramp. Once the 'inner chambers' were finished, the pit and ramp were filled in and the pyramid built over the top. This allowed the chambers to be made without tunneling, and avoided the structural complications of making chambers within the body of the pyramid itself. He also reverted to an earlier style of construction by creating a rectangular enclosure wall oriented north-south, similar to those of Djoser and Sekhemkhet.

Several pyramids and sun temples were built over natural mounds; utilising these may have been a way of shortening the actual work required, although the mound may have been symbolic of the primaeval mound of Egyptian creation myths.

See also
Egyptian pyramid construction techniques
List of Egyptian pyramids
List of megalithic sites

References

Sources

External links
  Newsweek's Interactive Graphic on Djedefre's pyramid with Interactive Timeline of the major pyramids of ancient Egypt*  Information with interactive map, videos & photos of the pyramid of Djedefre at Talking Pyramids

Buildings and structures completed in the 26th century BC
Abu Rawash
Pyramids of the Fourth Dynasty of Egypt
Djedefre